The Christian Reformed Church of Campo Belo formerly known asSwiss Evangelical Church of São Paulo is a Reformed Protestant church in Sao Paulo. It was organized in 1958 to serve the Swiss community. The current pastor is Claudio Marra.

A member of the World Communion of Reformed Churches.

References 

Presbyterian churches in South America
Members of the World Communion of Reformed Churches